Paul Sievert (12 March 1895 – 18 December 1988) was a German racewalker, best known for his achievements in the 50 kilometres race walk.

Career 

On 5 October 1924 in Munich, Sievert set a new world record in the 50 kilometres race walk.

Throughout his career, he won four national championships. Sievert also competed in the 50 km walk at the 1932 Summer Olympics, where he finished sixth.

References 

1895 births
1988 deaths
German male racewalkers
Athletes (track and field) at the 1932 Summer Olympics
Olympic athletes of Germany
Sportspeople from Braunschweig
Athletes from Berlin
World record setters in athletics (track and field)